The 1915 Maryland gubernatorial election occurred on the month of November, 1915. The race pitted Democratic Comptroller Emerson Harrington against future Republican United States Senator Ovington Weller. Harrington won the governor's office in a very narrow race.

Election results

References

Gubernatorial
1915
Maryland
November 1915 events